Coming Out was a Canadian television series, which aired on Maclean-Hunter's cable community channel in Toronto in 1972. It was the first Canadian television program targeted specifically to a lesbian, gay, bisexual and transgender community audience.

The program, a 13-episode documentary and interview series, profiled LGBT people living in Toronto in the earliest years of the gay rights movement. It was hosted by Paul Pearce and Sandra Dick of the Community Homophile Association of Toronto, and premiered on September 11, 1972.

References

1970s Canadian documentary television series
LGBT history in Canada
Canadian community channel television shows
1972 Canadian television series debuts
1972 Canadian television series endings
LGBT culture in Toronto
1970s Canadian LGBT-related television series
Documentaries about LGBT topics